Gloria Scott may refer to:

 Gloria Randle Scott (born 1938), American educator, and former head of the Girl Scouts of the USA
 Gloria Scott (singer) (born 1946), American singer
 Gloria Musu-Scott, former Chief Justice of Liberia
 Gloria Scott, a fictional ship featured in The Adventure of the Gloria Scott, a Sherlock Holmes story
 Gloria Scott, a Hollywood drugs counselor whose friendship with the Red Hot Chili Peppers and subsequent illness and death inspired their song Venice Queen. 

Scott, Gloria